Hempfield Township is the name of some places in the U.S. state of Pennsylvania:
Hempfield Township, Mercer County, Pennsylvania
Hempfield Township, Westmoreland County, Pennsylvania

See also
East Hempfield Township, Lancaster County, Pennsylvania
West Hempfield Township, Lancaster County, Pennsylvania 

Pennsylvania township disambiguation pages